Anabarhynchus albipennis is a species of stiletto fly in the family Therevidae. This species is endemic to New Zealand and has only been found at Lake Pukaki in Canterbury.

Taxonomy 
It was described by Lief Lyneborg in 1992 using a  specimen collected by W. J. Thompson at Lake Pukaki. The male holotype specimen is held at the Natural History Museum of Denmark.

Description 
The body length of this species is approximately 10 mm and the length of the wing is 7.5 mm. This species is only known from the male holotype specimen.

Distribution 

This species is endemic to New Zealand and is only known from its type locality of Lake Pukaki.

Conservation status 
The Department of Conservation has classified this species as "Data Deficient" under the New Zealand Threat Classification System.

References 

Therevidae
Insects described in 1992
Endemic fauna of New Zealand
Endemic insects of New Zealand
Diptera of New Zealand